Cimex antennatus is a species of Cimicidae (bed bugs) endemic to North America. Its primary hosts are bats.

References

Cimicidae
Parasitic bugs
Household pest insects
Insects described in 1965
Hemiptera of North America